New Economics or New Economy may refer to:

New classical macroeconomics
New Keynesian economics
New economic history, or cliometrics, the systematic application of econometrics

See also
New Economy movement (disambiguation)